Lecithocera didentata is a moth in the family Lecithoceridae. It was described by Chun-Sheng Wu and You-Qiao Liu in 1993. It is found in Anhui, China.

The wingspan is about 15 mm.

References

Moths described in 1993
didentata
Moths of Asia